Ferrosilicon is an alloy of iron and silicon with a typical silicon content by weight of 15–90%. It contains a high proportion of iron silicides.

Production and reactions
Ferrosilicon is produced by reduction of silica or sand with coke in the presence of iron. Typical sources of iron are scrap iron or millscale.  Ferrosilicons with silicon content up to about 15% are made in blast furnaces lined with acid fire bricks.

Ferrosilicons with higher silicon content are made in electric arc furnaces. The usual formulations on the market are ferrosilicons with 15%, 45%, 75%, and 90% silicon. The remainder is iron, with about 2% consisting of other elements like aluminium and calcium. An overabundance of silica is used to prevent formation of silicon carbide. Microsilica is a useful byproduct.

A mineral perryite is similar to ferrosilicon, with its composition Fe5Si2. In contact with water, ferrosilicon may slowly produce hydrogen.  The reaction, which is accelerated in the presence of base, is used for hydrogen production. The melting point and density of ferrosilicon depends on its silicon content, with two nearly-eutectic areas, one near Fe2Si and second spanning FeSi2-FeSi3 composition range.
{| class="wikitable" style="text-align:center;"
|+ Physical properties of ferrosilicon
|-
! Si mass fraction (%)
| 0 || 20 || 35 || 50 || 60 || 80 || 100
|-
! Solidus point (°C)
| 1538 || 1200  || 1203 || 1212 || 1207 || 1207 || 1414
|-
! Liquidus point (°C)
| 1538 || 1212  || 1410 || 1220 || 1230 || 1360 || 1414
|-
! Density (g/cm3)
| 7.87 || 6.76 || 5.65 || 5.1 || 4.27 || 3.44 || 2.33
|}

Uses
Ferrosilicon is used as a source of silicon to reduce metals from their oxides and to deoxidize steel and other ferrous alloys. This prevents the loss of carbon from the molten steel (so called blocking the heat); ferromanganese, spiegeleisen, calcium silicides, and many other materials are used for the same purpose. It can be used to make other ferroalloys.  Ferrosilicon is also used for manufacture of silicon, corrosion-resistant and high-temperature-resistant ferrous silicon alloys, and silicon steel for electromotors and transformer cores. In the manufacture of cast iron, ferrosilicon is used for inoculation of the iron to accelerate graphitization.  In arc welding, ferrosilicon can be found in some electrode coatings.

Ferrosilicon is a basis for manufacture of prealloys like magnesium ferrosilicon (MgFeSi), used for production of ductile iron.  MgFeSi contains 3–42% magnesium and small amounts of rare-earth metals.  Ferrosilicon is also important as an additive to cast irons for controlling the initial content of silicon.

Magnesium ferrosilicon is instrumental in the formation of nodules, which give ductile iron its flexible property. Unlike gray cast iron, which forms graphite flakes, ductile iron contains graphite nodules, or pores, which make cracking more difficult.

Ferrosilicon is also used in the Pidgeon process to make magnesium from dolomite.

Silanes 
Treatment of high-silicon ferrosilicon with hydrogen chloride is the basis of the industrial synthesis of trichlorosilane.

Ferrosilicon is also used in a ratio of 3–3.5% in the manufacture of sheets for the magnetic circuit of electrical transformers.

Hydrogen production

The method has been in use since World War I. Prior to this, the process and purity of hydrogen generation relying on steam passing over hot iron was difficult to control. The chemical reaction uses sodium hydroxide (NaOH), ferrosilicon, and water (H2O). The overall reaction of the process is believed to be:

 2NaOH + Si + H2O → 2Na2SiO3 + 2H2
Ferrosilicon is used by the military to quickly produce hydrogen for balloons by the ferrosilicon method. The generator may be small enough to fit in a truck and requires only a small amount of electric power, the materials are stable and not combustible, and they do not generate hydrogen until mixed.

One report notes that this method of hydrogen production wasn't thoroughly investigated for about century despite being reported by the US military in the beginning of 20th century.

Footnotes

References

Further reading

Deoxidizers
Ferroalloys
Iron
Silicon alloys